Sarah Elizabeth Reisman is a Chemistry Professor at the California Institute of Technology. She received the (2013) Arthur C. Cope Scholar Award and the (2014) Tetrahedron Young Investigator Award for Organic Synthesis. Her research focuses on the total synthesis of complex natural products.

Early career and education

Undergraduate Studies 

Reisman received a B.A. in Chemistry from Connecticut College in 2001, conducting research in the lab of Prof. Timo V. Ovaska on the synthesis of tetracyclic terpenoid natural products, including phorbol.

Graduate Studies 

Reisman obtained her Ph.D. from Yale University in 2006, working with John L. Wood on the total synthesis of (±)-welwitindolinone A isonitrile. Reisman's work included methodological developments towards a generalized skeleton, using nitrone cyclization and oxindole formation as linchpin transforms.

Postdoctoral Studies 

Reisman was an NIH Postdoctoral Fellow in the lab of Eric N. Jacobsen at Harvard University and worked with then-graduate student Abigail Doyle to develop an enantioselective substitution of silyl ketenes onto an alkoxy chloride via an oxocarbenium ion, using a novel thiourea organocatalyst.

Research 
Reisman began her independent career as an assistant professor at Caltech in 2008 and was promoted to full Professor in 2014.

The Reisman lab focuses on the synthesis of complex natural products and development of new chemical reactions, and the interplay between those two fields.

The group completed the first enantioselective total syntheses of (–)-acetylaranotin (40 years after its isolation), (–)-maoecrystal Z, (–)-8-demethoxyrunanine, and (–)-cepharatines A, C and D. Their total synthesis of (+)-ryanodol was completed in 15 synthetic steps, a significant improvement on the previous shortest synthetic route of 35 steps developed by Masayuki Inoue of the University of Tokyo. In 2019, Reisman and coworkers published the first total synthesis of isoryanoid diterpene (+)-perseanol in Nature. Other completed total syntheses include natural products (+)-naseseazines A and B, (+)-salvileucalin B, (+)-psiguadial B and (+)-pleuromutilin.

The group's reaction methodology work has focused primarily on nickel catalysis, cycloadditions, and opening of strained-ring precursors.

Selected Awards and Honors 

 2020 - American Chemical Society Elias J. Corey Award
 2019 – Margaret Faul Women in Chemistry Award
 2018 – Lucy Pickett Lecture, Mount Holyoke College
 2015–2017 – Heritage Medical Research Institute Investigator at the California Institute of Technology
 2015 – Science News "Ten early-career scientists on their way to critical acclaim" 
 2014 - Tetrahedron Young Investigator Award for Organic Synthesis 
 2013 – Arthur C. Cope Scholar Award from the American Chemical Society in 2013
 2012 – Inaugural American Chemical Society WCC's Rising Star Award winner” 
 2012 – Cottrell Scholar Award
 2012 – Novartis Early Career Award
 2012 – Amgen Young Investigator Award

Reisman was awarded the Boehringer Ingelheim New Faculty Grant, the Alfred P Sloan Foundation Fellowship and a 5-year NSF CAREER Award in 2011.

References 

Living people
21st-century American women scientists
21st-century American chemists
American women chemists
Year of birth missing (living people)
California Institute of Technology faculty
Yale University alumni
Connecticut College alumni